Hemorrhagic infarcts are infarcts commonly caused by occlusion of veins, with red blood cells entering the area of the infarct, or an artery occlusion of an organ with collaterals or dual circulation. These are typically seen in the brain,
lungs, and the GI tract, areas referred to as having "loose tissue," or dual circulation. Loose-textured tissue allows red blood cells released from damaged vessels to diffuse through the necrotic tissue. A white infarct, also called an anemic infarct, can become hemorrhagic with reperfusion. 
Hemorrhagic infarction is also associated with testicular torsion.

See also 
 Anemic infarct
 Infarction

References 

Vascular diseases
Gross pathology